The Brigantiaeaceae are a family of fungi in the order Teloschistales. Species in this family are lichenized with green algae, and are usually found growing on bark.

References

Teloschistales
Taxa described in 1982
Taxa named by Josef Hafellner
Lecanoromycetes families
Lichen families